Salah Aboud Mahmoud (born 1942; Arabic: صلاح عبود محمود missing since March 2003) is a former Iraqi Army general, best known for his role in Battle of Khafji and 73 Easting, during the Gulf War.

Career
On January 29, 1991, Mahmoud took part in battle with coalition forces to take control of the Saudi Arabian city of Khafji. Mahmoud also took part in the Iran–Iraq War of 1980–1988, along with the tank battle of 73 Easting.

Mahmoud was appointed commander of the Iraqi Third Corps in the aftermath of the Iran–Iraq War, a regular process in the Iraqi military to ensure that former high-ranking officers did not pose a threat to the Ba'athist Iraqi government. He was later governor of Dhi Qar Province, a Shia province which had briefly been taken by the 1991 Iraqi insurgency before it was brutally suppressed.

1990s
In December 1994, Major-General Wafiq Al-Samarrai defected to Jordan and called on officers to revolt against Saddam Hussein's regime. Mahmoud was one of them he called on. He did not, and despite his connections to many of the purged officers he was never executed. Rather, he was gradually forced out of his government roles. President Hussein divided Iraq into four administrative regions in 1998. Many expected Mahmoud would be recalled to the military and appointed to the Central Euphrates governorship as governor Mizban had been dismissed. However this did not come to pass and Mizban was reinstated.

Invasion of Iraq
After the invasion of Iraq in March 2003, Mahmoud disappeared and his current whereabouts are unknown.

See also 
List of people who disappeared

References
 Kenneth Pollack, Arabs at War: Military Effectiveness 1948–1991, University of Nebraska Press, 2002, p. 243–244.
 Spencer C. Tucker and Priscilla Mary Roberts, The Encyclopedia of Middle East Wars, October 2010, page 763.

1950 births
2000s missing person cases
Iraqi military personnel
Missing aviators
Missing person cases in Iraq